Zaton is a village in Croatia. 

Populated places in Zadar County